Tushar Ravi Kapoor (born 20 November 1976), popular as Tusshar Kapoor, is an Indian actor and film producer working in Hindi films.

Early and personal life

Tusshar Kapoor is the son of Indian actors Jeetendra and Shobha Kapoor. His sister Ekta Kapoor is a television and film producer. He attended the Bombay Scottish School where he was in the same class as Abhishek Bachchan. He then studied at the University of Michigan in Ann Arbor for his BBA degree at the Stephen M. Ross School of Business.

Like his father, Tusshar Kapoor is a follower of Nichiren Buddhism.

Inspiringly, Kapoor opted for IVF and became a single parent to Laksshya Kapoor through surrogacy in June 2016.

Career 

Prior to making his debut as an actor, Kapoor worked with film director David Dhawan as an assistant. Following this, he trained as an actor with Roshan Taneja and Mahendra Verma, in their acting school, and in dance with Nimesh Bhatt.

He made his debut in 2001 under guidance of his Gujarat-based friend Dharmanshu Parmar alias Monty with the blockbuster Mujhe Kucch Kehna Hai, a remake of the Telugu super hit Tholi Prema, along with Kareena Kapoor. He received the Filmfare Award for Best Male Debut for his work in the film. He then starred as Rahul in coming of age film Kyaa Dil Ne Kahaa alongside Esha Deol. Kapoor then appeared in two more Telugu remakes Jeena Sirf Merre Liye (2002), and Yeh Dil (2003), which fared poorly at the box office.

He then appeared in Ram Gopal Varma's production Gayab (2004) which was declared a below average at the box office but Kapoor received appreciation for his work. Starting in 2004, Kapoor starred in commercial hits such as Khakee (2004), Kyaa Kool Hai Hum (2005), Golmaal (2006), Shootout at Lokhandwala (2007) in which he has essayed the role of gangster Dilip Buwa, and received good reviews for his work, Golmaal Returns (2008), Golmaal 3 (2010), The Dirty Picture (2011), Kyaa Super Kool Hain Hum (2012), the critically acclaimed Shor in the City (2012), and Shootout at Wadala (2013).

In 2012, Kapoor took part in the "Fashion for a Cause" event which raised money for homeless children. He has co-produced the film Chaar Din Ki Chandni (2012), in which he has also starred. He worked as a lead actor in Bollywood adult comedies Kyaa Kool Hain Hum 3 (2016) and Mastizaade (2016) both did average business.

In 2017, he starred as Lucky in the comedy film Golmaal Again, which ended up being a blockbuster. In 2018, he was seen in Simmba, in a special appearance as himself in the song "Aankh Marey". He also voiced part of the song.

In 2019, he starred as Manav in the ALT Balaji's web horror series Boo Sabki Phategi alongside Mallika Sherawat,

In 2020 he produced Laxmii which starred Akshay Kumar, Kiara Advani, Sharad Kelkar and Ashwini Kalsekar. The film is co-produced by his production house Tushar Entertainment.

In 2021, he made his debut as an author with a book titled ‘Bachelor Dad’ published by Penguin. The book chronicles his journey as a single parent. The book addresses the questions facing single fathers.

Filmography

Film

OTT

References

External links 
 
 

Living people
Indian male film actors
Filmfare Awards winners
Ross School of Business alumni
Indian male voice actors
Male actors in Hindi cinema
Male actors from Mumbai
Punjabi people
Sindhi people
1976 births
Nichiren Buddhists
Indian Buddhists
21st-century Buddhists
Screen Awards winners
Zee Cine Awards winners